The École Nationale Supérieure de Mécanique et des Microtechniques (ENSMM) is a French school of engineering. It is part of Polyméca, a network of schools focusing on mechanical engineering.

History 
The school was founded in 1902 by the Université de Franche-Comté as Laboratoire de Chronométrie. In 1961, it turned to École nationale supérieure de chronométrie et micromécanique (ENSCM). Since the school is established in an area with a strong legacy on horology, ENSMM is deeply dedicated to the design and manufacturing of micro-mechanical devices and robotics.

Location 
It is located in the city of Besançon, France eastern area (by car, 4 hours from Paris, 2 hours and a half from Strasbourg and 2 hours and a half from Lyon).

Curriculum

Study in France 

The school educates 250 engineers every year on 6 fields:

 Materials science
 Mechatronics
 Mechanical engineering
 Micromechanics
 Optoelectronics and Microelectromechanical systems
 Industrial engineering

Students can choose to spend their last year within ENSMM or in one of the schools of the Polyméca network.

Study abroad 
The ENSMM has concluded a partnership with several universities worldwide:

 Technische Universität, Vienne, Austria
 Institut National d’Informatique, Alger, Algeria
 Federal University of Uberlândia, Brazil
 Universidade Polytechnique, São Paulo, Brazil
 École Polytechnique de Montréal, Montréal, Canada
 École de technologie supérieure, Montréal, Canada
 Université Laval, Québec, Canada
 Southwest Jiaotong University, Chengdu, China
 Shanghai Jiaotong University, China
 Technische Universität Ilmenau, Germany
 Hochschule Karlsruhe, Germany
 Université des Sciences et Techniques de Bucarest, Hungaria
 Indian Institute of Technology Kanpur, India
 Università degli Studi di Napoli Federico II, Italy
 Politecnico di Torino, Italy
 Politecnico di Milano, Italy
 Tokyo Denki University, Japan
 Ecole Nationale de l'Industrie Minérale, Rabat Morocco
 Université Technique, Cluj-Napoca, Romania
 Université Valahia, Targoviste, Romania
 Russian Academy of Sciences, Moscou, Russia
 Ivanovo State University of Chemistry and Technology, Russia
 Saint Petersburg State University of Aerospace Instrumentation, Saint Petersburg, Russia
 Escola Tecnica Superior d’Enginyeria Barcelona, Spain
 University of Oviedo, Spain
 University of Vigo, Spain
 University of Wales, Newport, United Kingdom
 Ohio State University, Columbus, USA

It also belongs to the N+i international network.

External links 
 Official Website of the ENSMM 
 Université de Franche-Comté
 N+i network website

Engineering universities and colleges in France
Universities and colleges in Besançon
Besançon
Educational institutions established in 1902
1902 establishments in France